"Der Fischer" is a ballad by Goethe, written in 1779. Goethe's poem describes an exchange between a fisher and a mermaid who accuses him of luring her brood. As revenge, she enchants him with her song and pulls him into the water.

Text

Musical settings

Alphons Diepenbrock 
Anton Eberl
Hans Sommer (1837–1922)
Johann Vesque von Püttlingen (1803–1883)
Anselm Hüttenbrenner  (1794–1868)
Fanny Mendelssohn
Franz Schubert (1797–1828)
Hector Berlioz (1803-1869)

Fine arts 
Between 1856 and 1858, Frederic Leighton made the painting The Fisherman and the Syren, which is now on display in the Bristol City Museum and Art Gallery, with explicit reference to Goethe's poem:

References

Sources 

 Brooks, Charles Timothy, trans. (1904). "The Fisher". In Carman, Bliss, et al. (eds.). The World’s Best Poetry. Vol. VI. Fancy. Philadelphia: John D. Morris & Co.
 Hyner, Bernadette H. & Stearns, Precious McKenzie (2009). Forces of Nature: Natural(-Izing) Gender and Gender(-Ing) Nature in the Discourses of Western Culture. Cambridge Scholars Publishing. 
 Rhys, Ernest (1900). Frederic Lord Leighton: An Illustrated Record of his Life and Work. London: George Bell & Sons.

Poetry by Johann Wolfgang von Goethe
1779 poems
Songs about fishers